Parabagrotis insularis is a species of moth in the family Noctuidae (owlet moths). It is found in North America, where it has been recorded from southern Vancouver Island, along the Pacific Coast through California to near the border with Mexico. The species was described by Augustus Radcliffe Grote in 1876.

The length of the forewings is 13–16 mm. Adults are variable in color and pattern, but can usually be recognized by the reniform spot, which is open towards the costa. The ground color is blackish gray to bright red brown. Adults are on wing from April to October.

The larvae probably feed on various grasses and herbaceous plants, possibly with a preference for the latter.

The MONA or Hodges number for Parabagrotis insularis is 11047.2.

References

Further reading
 Arnett, Ross H. (2000). American Insects: A Handbook of the Insects of America North of Mexico. CRC Press.
 Lafontaine, J. Donald & Schmidt, B. Christian (2010). "Annotated check list of the Noctuoidea (Insecta, Lepidoptera) of North America north of Mexico". ZooKeys, vol. 40, 1-239.
 Lafontaine, J. Donald / Dominick, R. B. et al., eds. (1998). "Noctuoidea Noctuidae (part) Noctuinae (part - Noctuini)". The Moths of America North of Mexico, fasc. 27.3, 348.

External links
Butterflies and Moths of North America
NCBI Taxonomy Browser, Parabagrotis insularis

Noctuinae
Moths described in 1876